The Grand Mufti of India is the most senior and influential religious authority of the Sunni Muslim Community of India. The incumbent is Sheikh Abubakr Ahmad, general secretary of All India Sunni Jamiyyathul Ulama, who was conferred the title in February 2019 at the Gareeb Nawaz Peace Conference held at Ramlila Maidan, New Delhi, organised by the All India Tanzeem Ulama-e-Islam.

Role
The Grand Mufti is the most senior religious authority in the country. His main role is to give opinions (fatawa) on Islamic legal matters and social affairs. The Grand Mufti is traditionally chosen from the Barelvi school of Sunni Islam.

History

Mughal period
The first Grand Mufti of India, Shah Fazle Rasool Badayuni was appointed by the final Mughal Emperor, Bahadur Shah Zafar. Badayuni was a Hanafi scholar who had deep knowledge of Islamic jurisprudence. His Urdu statements on Islamic subjects were published as Tariqi Fatwa, which later became famous. His grandson `Abd al-Qadir Bada'uni followed him as the Grand Mufti.

British period
In the British ruling period, Islamic scholars noted Ahmed Raza Khan Barelvi who was the spiritual leader of Indian Muslims, scholar and revivalist. Thousands of students and scholars were attracted to his works and requested him to become Grand Mufti, but he declined. He wanted to be engaged with educational revival and writing. Instead, his student Amjad Ali Aazmi was elected. His book on Hanafi fiqh, Bahar-e-Shariat became a reference on this subject. Along with him, Mustafa Raza Khan Qadri s/o. Ahmed Raza Khan Barelvi was the Grand Mufti during Indira Gandhi's administration. He protested the Family Planning Program enacted by the government.

Grand Muftiship of Sheikh Abubakr Ahmad 

Kanthapuram A. P. Aboobacker Musliyar was sworn in as the Grand Mufti of India on 24 February 2019 at the Ramlila Maidan. He became the first Grand Mufti from south India.

List of Grand Muftis of India

See also
Kanthapuram A. P. Aboobacker Musliyar
 Islam in India
 Grand Mufti
 Akhtar Raza Khan

References

Further reading 
 The first Interview with the Grand Mufti after the swearing by Ashwani Kumar of Khaleej Times: 
The second Interview with the Grand Mufti after the swearing by Berita Harian:

External links 
 
Profile of the Grand Mufti at World Sufi Forum's website
 
 
 

Titles
Grand Muftis
Grand Muftis of India
Religious leadership roles
Islamic religious leaders
Indian imams
Islam in India
Lists of Islamic religious leaders